Choksy is a Zoroastrian surname. Notable people with the surname include:

 Jamsheed Choksy, professor
 Kairshasp Nariman Choksy (1933–2015), Sri Lankan politician
 Nasarvanji Hormusji Choksy (1861–1939), British Indian physician
 Vishtasp Kairshasp Choksy (1969), Sri Lankan lawyer